The 2018 AFC Women's Asian Cup was the 19th edition of the AFC Women's Asian Cup, the quadrennial international football tournament in Asia competed by the women's national teams in the Asian Football Confederation (AFC). It was originally scheduled to be held in Jordan between 7 and 22 April 2018, but later was changed to 6 to 20 April 2018.

The tournament served as the final stage of Asian qualification for the 2019 FIFA Women's World Cup, with the top five teams qualifying for the World Cup in France.

Japan defeated Australia 1–0 in the final to win their second consecutive title. In the third-place match the same day, China PR defeated Thailand 3–1.

Qualification

The draw for the qualifiers was held on 21 January 2017. The top three finishers of the last AFC Women's Cup qualified automatically and did not have to enter qualifying, while Jordan also qualified automatically as hosts but decided to also participate in the qualifying competition. The matches were played from 3 to 12 April 2017.

Qualified teams
The following eight teams qualified for the tournament.

Venues
The competition was played in two venues in the city of Amman.

Draw
The final draw was held on 9 December 2017, 13:00 EET (UTC+2), at the King Hussein bin Talal Convention Center on the eastern shores of the Dead Sea. The eight teams were drawn into two groups of four teams. The teams were seeded according to their performance in the 2014 AFC Women's Asian Cup final tournament and qualification, with the hosts Jordan automatically seeded and assigned to Position A1 in the draw.

Squads

Each team must register a squad of minimum 18 players and maximum 23 players, minimum three of whom must be goalkeepers (Regulations Articles 31.4 and 31.5).

Match officials
A total of 10 referees and 12 assistant referees were appointed for the final tournament.

Referees

 Kate Jacewicz
 Casey Reibelt
 Qin Liang
 Mahsa Ghorbani
 Yoshimi Yamashita
 Ri Hyang-ok
 Oh Hyeon-jeong
 Thein Thein Aye
 Edita Mirabidova
 Công Thị Dung

Assistant referees

 Cui Yongmei
 Fang Yan
 Uvena Fernandes
 Ensieh Khabaz
 Maiko Hagio
 Naomi Teshirogi
 Hong Kum-nyo
 Kim Kyoung-min
 Lee Seul-gi
 Heba Saadieh
 Rohaidah Bte Mohd Nasir
 Trương Thị Lệ Trinh

Group stage
The top two teams of each group qualified for the 2019 FIFA Women's World Cup as well as the semi-finals. The third-placed team of each group entered the fifth-placed match.

Tiebreakers
Teams are ranked according to points (3 points for a win, 1 point for a draw, 0 points for a loss), and if tied on points, the following tiebreaking criteria are applied, in the order given, to determine the rankings (Regulations Article 11.5):
Points in head-to-head matches among tied teams;
Goal difference in head-to-head matches among tied teams;
Goals scored in head-to-head matches among tied teams;
If more than two teams are tied, and after applying all head-to-head criteria above, a subset of teams are still tied, all head-to-head criteria above are reapplied exclusively to this subset of teams;
Goal difference in all group matches;
Goals scored in all group matches;
Penalty shoot-out if only two teams are tied and they met in the last round of the group;
Disciplinary points (yellow card = 1 point, red card as a result of two yellow cards = 3 points, direct red card = 3 points, yellow card followed by direct red card = 4 points);
Drawing of lots.

All times are local, EEST (UTC+3).

Group A

Group B

Knockout stage
In the knockout stage, extra time and penalty shoot-out are used to decide the winner if necessary, except for the third place match where penalty shoot-out (no extra time) is used to decide the winner if necessary.

Bracket

Fifth place match
Winner qualified for 2019 FIFA Women's World Cup.

Semi-finals

Third place match

Final

Awards

The following awards were given at the conclusion of the tournament:

Goalscorers

Tournament teams ranking

Qualified teams for FIFA Women's World Cup
The following five teams from AFC qualified for the 2019 FIFA Women's World Cup.

1 Bold indicates champions for that year. Italic indicates hosts for that year.
2 Australia qualified as a member of the OFC in 1995, 1999 and 2003.

Broadcasting rights and sponsorships
Le Sports acquired the all-media broadcasting and signal production rights in China in 2015, but they collapsed due to financial problems thus giving in all the rights they've acquired and transferred them to China Central Television and PP Sports in 2017. Tire manufacturer Continental announced they would be official sponsor.

References

External links

, the-AFC.com
AFC Women's Asian Cup 2018, stats.the-AFC.com

 
2018
Women's Asian Cup
AFC Women's Asian Cup
2018 in Jordanian sport
2019 FIFA Women's World Cup qualification
2018 AFC Women's Asian Cup
April 2018 sports events in Asia
Australia at the 2019 FIFA Women's World Cup
China at the 2019 FIFA Women's World Cup
Japan at the 2019 FIFA Women's World Cup
South Korea at the 2019 FIFA Women's World Cup
Thailand at the 2019 FIFA Women's World Cup